Cham Konar (also Romanized as Cham Konār) is a village in Shahid Modarres Rural District, in the Central District of Shushtar County, Khuzestan Province, Iran. At the 2006 census, its population was 257, in 48 families.

References 

Populated places in Shushtar County